František Ipser (16 August 1927 – 9 December 1999) was a Czech football manager and former player.

As a player, Ipser played mostly for Slavia Prague, and won the Czechoslovak First League with Slavia in 1947. In 1948-1950 he played for ATK Prague as a part of his compulsory military service. Ipser made a total of 148 appearances in the Czechoslovak First League, scoring 5 goals. After finishing his active career, Ipser started to work as a football manager. He coached Slavia Prague in 1964-1966 and Baník Ostrava in 1970–1971. In latter years he also coached several lower division teams.

References

External links
  SK Slavia Praha profile
 

1927 births
1999 deaths
Czech footballers
Czechoslovak footballers
Czechoslovakia international footballers
SK Slavia Prague players
Dukla Prague footballers
Czech football managers
Czechoslovak football managers
SK Slavia Prague managers
FC Baník Ostrava managers
People from Chrudim
Association football defenders
Bohemians 1905 players
Sportspeople from the Pardubice Region